AKM Amanul Islam Chowdhury (died 27 July 2020) was a  Bangladeshi caretaker government adviser. He served in the Latifur Rahman Cabinet in charge of the ministries of Communications, Water Resources, and Ministry of Power, Energy and Mineral Resources.

Career
Chowdhury served as a chairman of Chittagong Port Authority and Dhaka Power Supply Authority. He was also a general manager of Bangladesh Railway.

In later life, Chowdhury served as an advisor of Unique Group and a consultant of Westin Dhaka.

Personal life
Chowdhury was a younger brother of the academician Serajul Islam Choudhury.

Chowdhury died on 27 July 2020, at Uttara's Crescent Hospital in Dhaka after contracting COVID-19.

References

2020 deaths
Advisors of Caretaker Government of Bangladesh
University of Dhaka alumni
Deaths from the COVID-19 pandemic in Bangladesh
Year of birth missing
Place of birth missing